Sir John Dryden, 2nd Baronet (c. 1580 – c. 1658) was an English politician who sat in the House of Commons  in two periods between 1640 and 1654.

Dryden was the son of Sir Erasmus Dryden, 1st Baronet and his wife Frances Wilkes, daughter of William Wilkes of Hodnel, Warwickshire.  In 1632, he succeeded to the baronetcy on the death of his father. He was High Sheriff of Northamptonshire in 1634.

In November 1640, Dryden was elected Member of Parliament for Northamptonshire in the Long Parliament. In 1654, he was re-elected MP for Northamptonshire in the First Protectorate Parliament. 
 
Dryden married firstly Priscilla Quarles, daughter of James Quarles of Romford Essex, and sister of the poet Francis Quarles, and secondly Anne Parvis, daughter of Henry Parvis of Ruckholts, Essex. He had no children from his first two wives. He married thirdly Honor Bevill, daughter of Sir Robert Bevill, of Chesterton, and by her had a family. His eldest son Robert succeeded to the baronetcy. Dryden was an uncle of the poet John Dryden.

References

 

1580s births
1650s deaths
High Sheriffs of Northamptonshire
Year of birth uncertain
Year of death uncertain
English MPs 1640–1648
English MPs 1654–1655
Baronets in the Baronetage of England
Dryden baronets